Pariyatti is a Pāli term referring to the study of Buddhism as contained within the suttas of the Pāli canon. It is related and contrasted with patipatti which means to put the theory into practice and pativedha which means penetrating it or rather experientially realising the truth of it.

According to U Ba Khin, Pariyatti is the teaching of the Buddha, the arahats (fully awakened beings) and the ariyas (persons who have tasted Nibbana), who have really and in detail understood the Four Noble Truths and teach what they themselves know to be true, what they have seen to be true and real from their own experience. At times, when it is not possible to find noble people such as a Buddha, arahats or ariyas to revere and rely on, one will have to establish as one's teacher the teachings of the Buddha contained in the 84,000 sections of the scriptures. One has to practise these teachings which lead to the path (magga) and fruition (phala) states and Nibbana. When one meets with a Buddha, arahats and noble ariyas, it is truly possible to practise morality, concentration and insight and attain the paths and fruits of awakening by merely listening to and following their teachings, which are given based on firsthand personal experience and knowledge.

References

Pali words and phrases
Theravada Buddhist philosophical concepts